Dentelbach is a river of Baden-Württemberg, Germany. It is a left tributary of the Steinach in Neuffen.

See also
List of rivers of Baden-Württemberg

References

Rivers of Baden-Württemberg
Rivers of Germany